Baykalsky Priboy is a rural locality (a settlement) in Kabansky District, Republic of Buryatia, Russia. The population was 118 as of 2010.

Geography 
Baykalsky Priboy is located 37 km southwest of Kabansk (the district's administrative centre) by road. Bolshaya Rechka is the nearest rural locality.

References 

Rural localities in Kabansky District
Populated places on Lake Baikal